Everything Is may refer to:
 Everything Is (album), a 2005 album by Nine Black Alps
 "Everything Is" (song), a 1994 song by Neutral Milk Hotel